Camp Kupugani is a multicultural summer camp for young women and young men, in girls-only, boys-only and blended sessions, with an emphasis on teaching them to recognize and eliminate stereotypes. "Kupugani" is a Zulu concept that means "To raise oneself up" It is located in Adeline, Illinois and is the only private, residential summer camp facility in the United States under black ownership. It is also an American Camp Association member.

History
The camp land history of Camp Kupugani dates back to the 1800s. In April 1951, the Board of Directors for the 4-H Camp of Northwestern Illinois purchased an original parcel of 110 acres of Midwest timberland along the Leaf River from brothers Ben and Deed Sjoberg. Later donations brought the site to its present 126 acres. The camp was named White Eagle, in honor of the old White Eagle Mill. Built in 1837 and located on what is now camp property,  today’s campgrounds contain remnants of the location's history, with the old mill forming the base of the dining hall fireplace.

Owner
The camp's owner and director is Kevin Gordon, the Canadian-born son of Jamaican immigrants. He has a degree in psychology from Harvard University and a law degree from the University of California, Berkeley. After college graduation, he continued working as an assistant camp director, traveled through Europe shortly after the fall of the Berlin Wall, traveled throughout Africa, and wrote a book chronicling his African adventures (titled Not Yet African). He has been involved with camping since 1990; before coming to Kupugani, he worked at camps in Wisconsin, Pennsylvania, and California. His wife Natasha Jackson is the food service manager.

Mission 
Kupugani's mission operates based on six core values: 
 Excellence ("Do your best")
 Empowerment ("Be your best")
 Community ("Show your best")
 Fun
 Safety
 Environment
In addition, an important feature of the camp's philosophy is its multicultural education program, designed to allow children from varied cultures and backgrounds to form a cohesive community while having fun, being empowered, and learning critical social skills. In addition to traditional camp activities such as hiking, water activities, and sports, campers participate in team activities which focus on team-building and accessing different cultures as well as self-expression and self-esteem. Like most summer camps, it is "tech-free", with campers not allowed to use cell phones, computers, or iPods. Kupugani has been widely recognized in the media, including features in Ebony Magazine, on the Tavis Smiley Radio program, and on WCPT Chicago radio, as well as articles in "Afrique" and "Insight News".

Program
Camp Kupugani serves children age 7 to 15. It offers 2-week girls only and boys only sessions, and 2- and 4-week "blended" sessions for both boys and girls. The camp also offers a mother-daughter weekend and a parent-child weekend experience. It was founded as a girls' camp; sessions for boys were added in 2009, and the blended session piloted in 2016.

Activities 
Camp Kupugani offers a variety of land, water, and adventure activities including:
 Rock Climbing
 Horse Riding
 Swimming 
 Basketball
 Badminton
 Pickleball
 River Walks
 Dam Jumping
 Lake Play
 Paddle Boarding
 GaGa
 Crate Stacking
 9 Square In The Air
 Slacklining
 Frisbee Golf
 Hiking
 Challenge Hikes
 Night Hikes
 Mud Volleyball
 Sand Volleyball
 Arts and Crafts
 Canoeing 
 Biking
 Ecology and Nature
 Soccer
 Archery
 Fishing

Membership

The camp draws its population from a wide range of children.  In addition to campers from as far as Japan, Spain, and England, others have joined them from California, Texas, New Mexico, Louisiana, Georgia, and Wisconsin, in addition to children from the camp's region of Northwest Illinois.   The campers' ethnic backgrounds are a mix: including Caucasian, Black/African-American, Hispanic/Latina, Asian, South Asian, and Biracial, including of Native American and Middle Eastern descent.

References

External links
 Camp Kupugani - official site

Kupugani
Buildings and structures in Ogle County, Illinois
Youth organizations based in Illinois